Extreme Weight Loss (originally titled Extreme Makeover: Weight Loss Edition for its first two seasons) is a television program on ABC that premiered on May 30, 2011. The show was formally a spin-off of the Extreme Makeover franchise, where individuals receive life-changing makeovers.

History
ABC announced it had ordered six episodes of the series on October 22, 2009, under the title Obese. On September 20, 2010, Chris Powell was announced as the trainer for the show, renamed Extreme Makeover: Weight Loss Edition. ABC also announced that a second season had been ordered, due to the length of time of filming (one year).

The series officially premiered on May 30, 2011 and was the top summer launch for an ABC series debut since August 2009.  The second season premiered on June 3, 2012 at 9:00 p.m. (Eastern)/8:00 p.m. (Central). The third season, now renamed Extreme Weight Loss, premiered on May 28, 2013.

Episodes

Season 1 (2011)

Season 2 (2012)

Season 3 (2013)

Season 4 (2014)

Season 5 (2015)

Ratings

Season 1 (2011)

Season 2 (2012)

Season 3 (2013)

See also
Extreme Makeover: Home Edition
Extreme Makeover

References

External links
 

American Broadcasting Company original programming
2011 American television series debuts
2015 American television series endings
2010s American reality television series
American television spin-offs
Reality television spin-offs
Extreme Makeover
Makeover reality television series
Fitness reality television series
Television shows set in California